Birth is an album by Keith Jarrett recorded in 1971 and released the next year. On five dates in July and August 1971 Jarrett went into the studio with his trio (Charlie Haden and Paul Motian) augmented with Dewey Redman on tenor saxophone and produced enough material for three albums, The Mourning of a Star (released in 1971), El Juicio (The Judgement) (released in 1975) and Birth. These albums marked the emergence of what would later be called Jarrett's "American quartet."

Reception
The Allmusic review by Scott Yanow awarded the album 3 stars, stating, "Not everything works, and there are some wandering moments, but the music always holds one's interest; one can easily see the potential that would soon be realized by this intriguing ensemble.".

Track listing
All compositions by Keith Jarrett
 "Birth" - 6:13  
 "Mortgage on My Soul" - 5:38  
 "Spirit" - 8:38  
 "Markings" - 0:37  
 "Forget Your Memories (And They'll Remember You)" - 6:57  
 "Remorse" - 11:22

Personnel
Keith Jarrett - piano, soprano saxophone, recorder, banjo, steel drums, vocals
Dewey Redman - tenor saxophone, Chinese musette, bells, clarinet, percussion, vocals
Charlie Haden - double-bass, congas, steel drums, clapper
Paul Motian - drums, steel drums, bells, percussion

References 

1971 albums
Keith Jarrett albums
Albums produced by George Avakian
Atlantic Records albums